Heroes of Olympus is a role-playing game first published by Task Force Games in 1981.

Description
Heroes of Olympus is a fantasy system set in the heroic age of ancient Greece. The player characters are Argonauts, adventurers in the crew of the hero Jason. The rules cover the backgrounds and abilities of the Argonauts, character improvement, combat (including rules for trickery), sailing, magic, nonhuman races, the gods, and how to run a campaign. The set comes with four scenarios (with a color map for each), including the Golden Fleece, and encounters with the Harpies and Clashing Rocks. 

Heroes of Olympus is based on Greek mythology and players either take on the roles of Argonauts in Jason's crew or else make their own heroes using point-based character creation. The game includes two tactical combat systems for melee and a naval combat system, and was an attempt to bring together elements from roleplaying games, board games and wargames.

The 2nd edition adds some sample miniatures and an article from Different Worlds for adapting the characters to Thieves' World.

Publication history
Heroes of Olympus was written by B. Dennis Sustare, and published by Task Force Games in 1981. It was a boxed set with an orange cover, containing a 56-page book, five maps, two cardboard counter sheets, and dice. Heroes of Olympus was the first of a number of pseudo-RPGs that Task Force Games produced, of the sort that were also appearing at other wargaming companies such as SPI's DragonQuest and Metagaming Concepts's The Fantasy Trip. Heroes of Olyumpus was supported by a pair of magazine articles, and did earn a second edition in 1983. The second edition was a larger boxed set with a cover by Chris White, containing a 56-page book, a pamphlet, five maps, counters, metal miniatures, and dice.

Reception
According to Shannon Appelcline, although the game had elements of roleplaying games, board games and wargames, "it was probably as much of
a roleplaying game as other RPGs from the same time period," such as DragonQuest and The Fantasy Trip.

Reviews
Different Worlds #30 (Sept., 1983)

References

Fantasy role-playing games
Role-playing games introduced in 1981
Task Force Games games